The Moolarben Coal Mine is a coal mine located in the New South Wales. The mine has coal reserves amounting to 0.5 billion tonnes of raw coking coal. The mine has an annual production capacity of 13 million tonnes of coal.

References 

Coal mines in New South Wales